Whelks are any of several carnivorous sea snail species with a swirling, tapered shell. Many are eaten by humans, such as the common whelk of the North Atlantic. Most whelks belong to the family Buccinidae and are known as "true whelks." Others, such as the dog whelk, belong to several sea snail families that are not closely related. 

True whelks (family Buccinidae) are carnivorous, and feed on annelids, crustaceans, mussels and other molluscs, drilling holes through shells to gain access to the soft tissues. Whelks use chemoreceptors to locate their prey.

Many have historically been used, or are still used, by humans and other animals as food.

Dog whelk, a predatory species, was used in antiquity to make a rich red dye that improves in color as it ages.

Usage
The common name "whelk" is also spelled welk or even wilk.

The species, genera and families referred to by this common name vary a great deal from one geographic area to another.

United States
In the United States, whelk refers to several large edible species in the genera Busycon and Busycotypus, which are now classified in the family Buccinidae. These are sometimes called Busycon whelks.

In addition, the unrelated invasive murex Rapana venosa is referred to as the Veined rapa whelk or Asian rapa whelk in the family Muricidae.

Brazil
In Brazil, there is a very popular Afro-Brazilian divination game practiced by older women of African ancestry called jogo de búzios (game of whelks), which uses empty shells of these gastropods.

British Isles, Belgium, Netherlands
In the British Isles, Belgium and the Netherlands (wulk/wullok), the word is used for a number of species in the family Buccinidae, especially Buccinum undatum, an edible European and Northern Atlantic species.

In the British Isles, the common name "dog whelk" is used for Nucella lapillus (family Muricidae) and for Nassarius species (family Nassariidae). Historically, they were a popular street food in Victorian London, typically located close to public houses and theatres.

Scotland
In Scotland, the word "whelk" is also used to mean the periwinkle (Littorina littorea), family Littorinidae.

West Indies
In the English-speaking islands of the West Indies, the word whelks or wilks (this word is both singular and plural) is applied to a large edible top shell, Cittarium pica, also known as the magpie or West Indian top shell, family Trochidae.

Asia

In Japan,  are frequently used in sashimi and sushi. In Vietnam, they are served in a dish called Bún ốc - vermicelli with sea snails.  is a Korean dish consisting of whelks and with chili sauce in a salad with cold noodles. It has been a very popular side dish with alcohol for many generations.

Australia, New Zealand
In Australia and New Zealand, species of the genus Cabestana (family Ranellidae) are called predatory whelks, and species of Penion (family Buccinidae) are called siphon whelks.

Some common examples
 Channeled whelk
 Common whelk
 Knobbed whelk, the state shell of Georgia and New Jersey
 Lightning whelk
 Red whelk
 Speckled whelk
 "Wrinkled whelk", "inflated whelk", and "lyre whelk", common names for Neptunea lyrata
 Wrinkled purple whelk

See also
 Conch, another common name used for a wide variety of large sea snails or their shells

References

 The Georgia Shell Club webpage entry for whelk, Busycon species

External links

Nutrition facts for "whelk" (species not indicated) as a food source
The Marine Life Information Network - The Common Whelk

Commercial molluscs
Mollusc common names